Prionapteryx albipennis is a moth in the family Crambidae. It was described by Arthur Gardiner Butler in 1886. It is found in India.

References

Ancylolomiini
Moths described in 1886